Mama Said may refer to:

Songs
 "Mama Said" (Lukas Graham song), a 2014 single
 "Mama Said" (Metallica song), a 1996 country rock ballad
 "Mama Said" (The Shirelles song), in 1961
 "Mama Said", a 2013 song by New Zealand boy band Moorhouse (band)
 "Mama Said", the third song from Carleen Anderson's 1994 album True Spirit

Other
 Mama Said (album), the second studio album by American rock musician Lenny Kravitz
 "Mama Said", the 203rd episode of the American fantasy animated television series Adventure Time